"Carefree Highway" is a song written by Gordon Lightfoot and was the second single release from his 1974 album, Sundown. It peaked at No. 10 on the Billboard Hot 100 and spent one week at No. 1 on the Easy Listening chart in October 1974.

The title comes from a section of Arizona State Route 74 in north Phoenix. Said Lightfoot, "I thought it would make a good title for a song. I wrote it down, put it in my suitcase and it stayed there for eight months." The song employs "Carefree Highway" as a metaphor for the state of mind where the singer seeks escape from his ruminations over a long ago failed affair with a woman named Ann. Lightfoot has stated that Ann actually was the name of a woman Lightfoot romanced when he was age 22: "It [was] one of those situations where you meet that one woman who knocks you out and then leaves you standing there and says she's on her way."

Chart performance

Weekly charts

Year-end charts

References

External links
 Lyrics of this song

1974 singles
Gordon Lightfoot songs
Songs written by Gordon Lightfoot
Song recordings produced by Lenny Waronker
1974 songs
Reprise Records singles